Batrachochytrium salamandrivorans (Bsal) is a pathogenic chytrid fungus that infects amphibian species. Although salamanders and newts seem to be the most susceptible, some anuran species are also affected.  Bsal has emerged recently and poses a major threat to species in Europe and North America.

It was described in 2013 based on a strain collected from skin tissue of fire salamanders Salamandra salamandra. The pathogen, unidentified up to then, had devastated fire salamander populations in the Netherlands. Molecular phylogenetics confirmed it as related to the well known chytrid B. dendrobatidis. Like this species, it causes chytridiomycosis, which is manifested in skin lesions and is lethal for the salamanders. Damage to the epidermal layer can be extensive and may result in osmoregulatory issues or sepsis. 

Another study estimated that this species had diverged from B. dendrobatidis in the Late Cretaceous or early Paleogene.  While initial susceptibility testing showed frogs and caecilians seemed to be resistant to Bsal infection, it was lethal to many European and some North American salamanders. East Asian salamanders were susceptible but able to tolerate infections. The fungus was also detected in a more-than-150-year-old museum specimen of the Japanese sword-tailed newt. This suggests it had originally emerged and co-evolved with salamanders in East Asia, forming its natural reservoir, and was introduced to Europe rather recently through the trade of species such as the fire belly newts as pets. The asian origin hypothesis for Bsal is supported by additional studies which have found Bsal in wild urodela populations in Asia and in animals of asian origin being transported via the pet trade. Since the pathogens initial discovery, it has been found in several additional areas across Europe in both wild and captive populations. One study was able to detect Bsal in 7 of 11 captive urodele collections. 

The description of this pathogen and its aggressiveness raised concern in the scientific community and the public, fearing that it might be a rising threat to Western hemisphere salamanders. On January 12, 2016, the U.S. government issued a directive that prohibited the importation of salamanders in order to reduce the threat posed by B. salamandrivorans.

Etymology
Batrachochytrium is derived from the Greek words batrachos, "frog", and chytra, "earthen pot" (describing the structure that contains unreleased zoospores); salamandrivorans is from the Greek salamandra, "salamander", and Latin vorans, "eating", which refers to extensive skin destruction and rapid death in infected salamanders.

Susceptible Species
The most comprehensive Bsal species susceptibility performed to date has been by Martel et al 2014. Their experiments demonstrated Bsal susceptibility followed a phylogenetic trend with many Salamandridae species being lethally susceptible. Recent work has demonstrated that some lungless species, specifically those in the Spelerpini tribe might also be clinically susceptible to Bsal 

Tolerant 

Salamandrella keyserlingii

Siren intermedia

Susceptible

Cynops cyanurus

Cynops pyrrhogaster

Paramesotriton deloustali

Lethal 

Hydromantes strinatii

Salamandrina perspicillata

Salamandra salamandra

Pleurodeles waltl

Tylototriton wenxianensis

Notophthalmus viridescens

Taricha granulosa

Euproctus platycephalus

Lissotriton italicus

Ichthyosaura alpestris

Triturus cristatus

Neurergus crocatus

Eurycea wilderae

Pseudotriton ruber

Information Sources 
More information on Bsal  and other diseases impacting amphibian populations, including Batrachochytrium dendrobatidis and Ranavirus can be found at the Southeast Partners in Amphibian and Reptile Conservation disease task team web-page.

References

External links

Chytridiomycota
Fungi described in 2013
Parasitic fungi